A blue diamond is a diamond whose color is blue.

Blue diamond may also refer to:

Locations 
 Blue Diamond (building) a skyscraper in Miami, United States
 Blue Diamond, Kentucky, an unincorporated community in the United States
 Blue Diamond, Nevada, a census-designated place in Clark County, Nevada, United States
 Blue Diamond (Iceland), a tourist route in Iceland

Music 
 "Blue Diamond", the original title of Big Blue Diamonds, a song recorded by Gene Summers
 The Blue Diamonds, a Dutch 1960s rock and roll duo
 "Blue Diamonds", a song from Rusted Root's 2002 album Welcome to My Party
 "Blue Diamonds", a song from The Long Winters' 2003 album When I Pretend to Fall

Organizations 
 Blue Diamond Growers, a California-based agricultural cooperative and marketing organization that specializes in almonds
 Blue Diamond Truck Company, a joint venture between Ford Motor Company Navistar International 
Blue Diamond, a bus company in West Midlands 
 The Blue Diamond Society, an LGBT rights organisation in Nepal
Blue Diamonds (aerobatic team), aerobatic display team of the Philippine Air Force
 "Blue Diamonds", No. 92 Squadron RAF aerobatic display team

Other 
 A viagra tablet 
 Blue Diamond (comics), a 1940s superhero from Timely Comics, a forerunner of Marvel Comics
 Blue diamond impatiens, a flowering plant of the family Balsaminaceae
 The Blue Diamond Affair, a series of events triggered by the 1989 theft of gems belonging to the Saudi royal family
 Nickname of the United States Navy Strike Fighter Squadron 146
 Blue Diamond, a character on the Cartoon Network show Steven Universe